St Volodymyr Chapel (properly Grand Prince St. Vladimir, Equal-to-the-Apostles) is a small Ukrainian Orthodox Chapel which serves the Vernadsky Research Base on Galindez Island, Antarctica. It is one of eight churches in Antarctica. It is dedicated to St. Vladimir the Great.

The chapel, a simple wooden construction, was built on the island in 2011. Its creation was funded by philanthropists. It was consecrated by the then Metropolitan of Lviv and Galicia, Augustine. Despite its small size, the chapel is richly decorated. Its contents include an icon of St. Nicholas.

References

Churches completed in 2011
2011 establishments in Antarctica
Churches in Antarctica
21st-century Eastern Orthodox church buildings